Yohannes Tilahun (born 16 October 1993) is an Eritrean footballer. He currently plays for the Eritrea national football team.

International career
Tilahun played in the 2009 CECAFA Cup in Kenya, appearing in the 2–1 group match defeat to Rwanda.

References

External links
 

Living people
1993 births
Eritrean footballers
Eritrea international footballers
Association football midfielders
Mai Temenai FC players
Sportspeople from Asmara
Eritrean Premier League players